X Factor is a Danish television music competition showcasing new singing talent. This season will mark the end of Sofie Linde Ingversen as the host of the show after she announced her departure on January 31, 2023.

For the first time on the Danish X factor a contestant had survived the bottom two 3 times and made it to the semifinals.

Judges and hosts
Thomas Blachman and Kwamie Liv will return for ther fifteenth and second seasons as judges while Martin Jensen has left and will not return and Simon Kvamm will replace Martin Jensen as the new judge Sofie Linde Ingversen will return for her eight season as host

Selection process
Auditions took place in Copenhagen and Aarhus.

The 18 successful acts were:
Thomas Blachman: Rosita Bramsen, Nanna & Frida, Clara Nedergaard, Sigalaz, Annika Thaarup, Peter Thomsen
Kwamie Liv: Nimbahlou Christensen, DiVERSE, Mathias Donby, Henrik Hedelund, Lav Sol, Luka Lind
Simon Kvamm: Kristoffer Lundholm, Misunderstood, Lise Ranks, Malou Røjbæk, ROSÉL, Theodor Vestergaard

Bootcamp

The 9 eliminated acts were:
Thomas Blachman: Nanna & Frida, Annika Thaarup, Peter Thomsen
Kwamie Liv: Mathias Donby, Lav Sol, Luka Lind
Simon Kvamm: Misunderstood, Lise Ranks, Malou Røjbæk

Finalists

Key:
 – Winner
 – Runner-up
 – 3rd Place

Live shows

Colour key

Contestants' colour key:
{|
|-
| – Kwamie Liv's Contestants
|-
| – Thomas Blachmans's Contestants
|-
| – Simon Kvamm's Contestants
|}

Live show details

Week 1 (February 17) 
Theme: Signature

Judges' votes to eliminate
 Blachman: DiVERSE
 Liv: Rosita Bramsen
 Kvamm: DiVERSE

Week 2 (February 24) 
Theme: Decade 2000s (Songs that had been released from 2000 to 2009)

Judges' votes to eliminate
 Blachman: Nambahlou Christensen
 Liv: Rosita Bramsen
 Kvamm: Rosita Bramsen

Week 3 (March 3) 
Theme: Soup, Steak & Ice Cream (Danish top & Giro 413 with a twist)
Musical Guest: Ekspressen ("Godter på Vej")

Judges' votes to eliminate
 Kvamm: Henrik Hedelund
 Liv: Kristoffer Lundholm
 Blachman: Henrik Hedelund

Week 4 (March 10) 
Theme: At The Club

Judges' votes to eliminate
 Kvamm: Nambahlou Christensen
 Liv: Kristoffer Lundholm
 Blachman: Kristoffer Lundholm

Week 5 (March 17) 
Theme: You Are Not Alone
Group Performance: "Du er Ikke Alene"
Musical Guest: Jada ("Not Alone")

Judges' votes to eliminate
 Blachman: Nambahlou Christensen
 Liv: Clara Nedergaard
 Kvamm: Clara Nedergaard

References

The X Factor seasons